My Way to Love is the debut studio album of Taiwanese singer-songwriter Eric Chou, released by Sony Music Taiwan on 19 December 2014. The album contains 11 songs, all composed by Chou, including the smash hit, "The Distance of Love", which was used as the ending theme of the 2014 Taiwanese drama The Way We Were. Taiwanese producer and Golden Melody Award winner Chen Chien Chi (陳建騏) served as the album producer.

The album went on to top 18 charts upon its release, and the music video for "The Distance of Love" reached more than 100 million views on YouTube, making Chou the youngest Mandopop artist who had the most views in the platform at that time.

Background and release 
Chou wrote the song "The Distance of Love" when he was still a student in Boston, USA. He drew inspiration from his failed attempt at impressing a girl he liked in high school. He would then perform the song at Taiwanese actors Eddie Huang (黃懷晨) and Queenie Tai's wedding, where he was talent scouted by the former, as a recommendation by Chou's father who "has a son that can sing". Eventually, the song was used as the ending theme of the 2014 Taiwanese drama The Way We Were. It was officially released as a single under Sony Music Taiwan on 1 August 2014 and appeared on Chou's debut studio album which was released on 24 December of that same year.

Track listing

References 

2014 albums
Eric Chou albums